H shares refer to the shares of companies incorporated in  mainland China that are traded on the Hong Kong Stock Exchange. Many companies float their shares simultaneously on the Hong Kong market and one of the two mainland Chinese stock exchanges in Shanghai or Shenzhen, they are known as A+H companies.

H shares are also held by a nominee service company "HKSCC Nominees Limited", which was owned by Hong Kong Exchanges and Clearing.

Price discrepancies between the H shares and the A share counterparts of the same company are not uncommon. A shares generally trade at a premium to H shares as the People's Republic of China government restricts mainland Chinese people from investing abroad and foreigners from investing in the A-share markets in mainland China.

Index for H shares

The index for H shares was called Hang Seng China Enterprises Index..

See also
Chip
 A share
 B share
 Red chip companies incorporated outside mainland China but main business was related to mainland China, and listed in Hong Kong Stock Exchange 
 P chip
 S chip
 N share
 L share
 G share
 China Concepts Stock

References

Stock market terminology
Finance in Hong Kong
Finance in China

de:Aktienart_(China)#H-Aktie_.28H-Share.29